Guy Hernandez (29 November 1927 – 22 October 2020) was a French diver. He competed in two events at the 1948 Summer Olympics.

References

1927 births
2020 deaths
French male divers
Olympic divers of France
Sportspeople from Casablanca
Divers at the 1948 Summer Olympics
Place of birth missing
20th-century French people